Gérard Barras (born 12 January 1937) is a Swiss former athlete. He competed in the men's pole vault at the 1960 Summer Olympics.

References

External links
 

1937 births
Living people
Athletes (track and field) at the 1960 Summer Olympics
Swiss male pole vaulters
Olympic athletes of Switzerland
Universiade silver medalists for Switzerland
Universiade medalists in athletics (track and field)
Medalists at the 1961 Summer Universiade
People from Brig-Glis
Sportspeople from Valais